Natalia Trayanova FAHA FHRS is a Professor of Biomedical Engineering in the Department of Medicine at Johns Hopkins University. She directs the Alliance for Cardiovascular Diagnostic and Treatment Innovation

Early life and education 
Trayanova's father was a physiologist and director of the Biophysics Institute in Bulgaria. Her mother was a professor of economics. She studied physics at Sofia University, graduating in 1982. Her father gave her a copy of Robert Plonsey's book, Bioelectric Phenomena, and Trayanova realised she could use her physics expertise in biology. She earned a PhD from the Bulgarian Academy of Sciences in 1986, where she studied skeletal muscle fibre biopotentials

Research and career 
In 1986 Trayanova joined Duke University working with Robert Plonsey on rhythmic dysfunction in the heart. In 1995 she was appointed associate professor at Tulane University, where she was awarded the several awards for teaching excellence. She began to develop computer models for the heart but found that the cardiologists were not enthusiastic about computer modelling. After Hurricane Katrina, several research institutions asked Trayanova to relocate and join them. She was awarded a Fulbright Program Visiting Professorship and spent several months at the University of Oxford.

In 2006 Trayanova was recruited to Johns Hopkins University as a Professor in the Johns Hopkins Biomedical Engineering and Institute for Computational Science. Her work considers computational simulations of the heart. She was elected a Fellow of the Biomedical Engineering Society and American Heart Association in 2010. In 2011 she developed a computational framework that allowed virtual drug screening, simulating the drug-channel interactions and predicting the impact of drugs on electrical activity of the heart.

In 2012 she was named the Murray B Sachs Endowed Chair in Johns Hopkins Biomedical Engineering Department. In 2013 she was awarded the National Institutes of Health Director's Pioneer Award, which allowed her to develop a virtual electrophysiology lab. The award gave her $2.5 million over five years to develop patient-specific computational models of the heart, allowing for doctors to provide personalised treatment and diagnoses. She has received extensive support from the Maryland Innovation Initiative. In 2019, she was inducted into the Women in Technology International Hall of Fame, and she also received the 2019 Heart Rhythm Society Distinguished Scientist Award. Also in 2019, she was elected Fellow of the National Academy of Inventors.

She is the Chief Scientific Officer of Cardiosolv Ablation Technologies, a start-up that develops computational tools to help the treatment of ventricular tachycardia. She gave a TED talk in 2017 entitled Your Personal Virtual Heart. She was selected by the National Institutes of Health to take part in a briefing at Capitol Hill looking to defend the federal funding of scientific research. She was elected a Fellow of the International Academy of Medical and Biological Engineering in 2017.  She has been featured on Reddit AMA r/science, has been interviewed by the BBC, NPR, the Economist, and has been on the Amazing Things Podcast.

References 

Bulgarian women academics
Living people
Bulgarian physicists
Fulbright Distinguished Chairs
Johns Hopkins Biomedical Engineering faculty
Tulane University faculty
Sofia University alumni
Duke University faculty
Bulgarian emigrants to the United States
20th-century women engineers
21st-century women engineers
Bulgarian women engineers
20th-century Bulgarian women
21st-century Bulgarian women
Year of birth missing (living people)
American biomedical engineers
Fellows of the American College of Cardiology
Fellows of the American Heart Association
Fellows of the American Institute for Medical and Biological Engineering
Fellows of the Biomedical Engineering Society
Fellows of the European Society of Cardiology
Fellows of the National Academy of Inventors